Jamil Canal, a native of Brazil, spent most of his career as a goalkeeper in the American Soccer League.  From 1973 to 1975, he was the ASL All Star goalkeeper while playing with the New York Apollo.  In 1976, he moved to the expansion Tacoma Tides.  However, the Tides folded at the end of the season and Canal moved back to New York where he spent the 1977 season as the backup to Keith Van Eron.  Canal regained his starting position in 1978 and held it through at least the 1980 season.  He continues to play today with the New York Greek-Americans’ over-30 team.

External links
 Tides roster

1946 births
Living people
Brazilian footballers
Association football goalkeepers
American Soccer League (1933–1983) players
New York Apollo players
Tacoma Tides players
Expatriate soccer players in the United States
Brazilian expatriate footballers
Brazilian expatriate sportspeople in the United States